The Eleventh is the first studio album by the Denver, Colorado based industrial metal band Rorschach Test. It was released in 1996 according to the band's official webpage. The band describes the album as their "sophomore" album.

Track listing

The album includes:

Notes

References

1996 debut albums
Rorschach Test (band) albums